Petawawa is a town located in the eastern portion of Southern Ontario.

Petawawa may also refer to:

 Petawawa Heliport, located 3.5 nautical miles northwest of Petawawa, Ontario Canada
 Petawawa River, a river in the Saint Lawrence River drainage basin in Nipissing District and Renfrew County in eastern and northeastern Ontario, Canada.
 Garrison Petawawa, located in Petawawa, Ontario, it is operated as an army base by the Canadian Army